The Harding Schoolhouse, in Corson County, South Dakota near Trail City, was listed on the National Register of Historic Places in 1989.

It is a wood-frame schoolhouse built in 1931, a late date for such a structure.

References

Schools in South Dakota
National Register of Historic Places in Corson County, South Dakota